Cherai is a small town located in north side of Vypin island. It is a region in the suburb of the city of Kochi, in the state of Kerala, India. Cherai has the longest beach in Kochi - the Cherai beach. The beach is located towards the centre-north of the Vypin island.

Dolphins are occasionally seen here.

Cherai has played an important role in the history of modern Kerala by becoming the birthplace of two prominent political personsages of modern Kerala - Mathai Manjooran and Sahodaran Ayyappan.

Cherai Gowreeshwara Temple is one of the main Hindu temples. The temple is maintained by Vijnana Vardhini Sabha (V. V Sabha).  It also known as Kerala palani. The festival in the temple is the biggest festival in Eranakulam district.  The festival happens every year towards the last 2 weeks of January or first 2 weeks of February.  The main attractions are Elephant march (around 20-30 elephants).

There is one more famous temple in Cherai, which is Azheekkal Sree Varaha Temple famous for its beautiful chariot. It is one of the oldest temple owned by Gowda Saraswatha Community.

Nearby attractions
 Kottakkavu Mar Thoma Syro-Malabar Pilgrim Church, North Paravur: First church in India and one of the seven churches founded by St. Thomas the Apostle in the first century.
 Portuguese Fort : Built in 1503 by the Portuguese also known as Pallipuram Fort (Aya Kotta). It is the oldest European monument in India.  It was an out post to safeguard the famous Muziris Port. In 1661 the Dutch captured the fort and in 1789 the fort was handed over to the King of Travancore.
 Pallipuram Syro-Malabar Church : The church is built by the Portuguese in 1577. The exquisite picture of Ave Mary on the top of "Altar" is brought from Portugal.The yearly celebrations of Lady of snow happening in August every year.The Water parade of boats is one of the notable function .

Notable people

Mathai Manjooran
Sahodaran Ayyappan
Mary Verghese
TVR Shenoy
S. Sharma
M. K. Prasad

Gallery

External links 

 Satellite image of the town

Geography of Ernakulam district
Tourist attractions in Kochi
Beaches of Kerala